Nether Burrow is a small hamlet in the Lunesdale Valley of North Lancashire, England.  It is a small settlement on the banks of the River Lune. There is not much there but there is a pub called the Highwayman Inn. It is on the A683 road between Lancaster and Kirkby Lonsdale. It forms part of the civil parish with the unusual name of Burrow-with-Burrow.

Geography of the City of Lancaster
Villages in Lancashire